General elections were held in Paraguay on 15 February 1953. At the time, the Colorado Party was the only legally permitted party. As such, incumbent president candidate Federico Chávez was re-elected unopposed.

Chávez would only stay in office for a little over a year before he was overthrown in a May 1954 coup led by General Alfredo Stroessner, who was elected his successor in special election in July.

Results

References

Paraguay
1953 in Paraguay
Elections in Paraguay
Single-candidate elections
Presidential elections in Paraguay
February 1953 events in South America
Election and referendum articles with incomplete results